Joan Ball (born 1934) started the first computer dating service in England in 1964. Ball's computer dating service also pre-dated the earliest American computer dating services, like Operation Match at Harvard.

Early life 
Joan Ball was born in 1934 and was the 6th child in her working-class family. She was abandoned by her mother when she was very young. During World War II she was evacuated from London to the countryside to escape the aerial bombardments. Joan was sexually harassed by one of the foster families with whom she lived in the countryside.

Joan Ball was dyslexic (although not diagnosed until she was 39) and struggled in school. As a coping mechanism she became the class clown so that she could make sure people "laughed with [her]" and not at her. In 1949, Ball finished her last year of school and got a job as a shop assistant at The London Co-operative Society. Due to her dyslexia she had problems with writing and counting money.

Career and later life

Department store work 
In 1953, Ball was hospitalized after a suicide attempt, after which she lived with her aunt Maud and uncle Ted. The same year, at the age of 19, she was hired at Bourne & Hollingsworth. In 1954, she left and started working in a store's dress department. Shortly after she started working for Berkertex, a leading fashion house in London.

Entry into computer dating 
In 1961, when Ball was 27, she decided to leave Berkertex. She then took a job at a marriage bureau before starting her own marriage bureau. She founded the Eros Friendship Bureau Ltd in 1962. She had trouble advertising her service early on because there was a widespread belief at the time that marriage bureaus were actually fronts for prostitution. Because she could not easily advertise in print, Ball relied on placing radio ads with the "Pop Pirates"—the pirate radio stations that operated just off the coast of Britain in the 1960s playing rock and roll music that the BBC had banned. Ball's company focused on long term match-ups and relationships—primarily trying to achieve marriages for clients—and catered to an older crowd who were looking to settle down or who had been previously divorced.

In 1964 Joan changed the name of her marriage bureau to the St. James Computer Dating Service, and the bureau ran its first set of computer match ups in 1964. This made Ball's service the first commercially successful computer dating service in either the UK or the US.

In 1965, Ball merged her company with another marriage bureau run by a woman and together they formed Com-Pat, or Computer Dating Services Ltd. Shortly after the merger, the owner of the other marriage bureau sold out her share in the company to Joan and Joan became the sole proprietor of Com-Pat.

Dateline, founded by John Richard Patterson in 1966, was a rival to Com-Pat. With this new rivalry, Ball saw a need for more advertising. By 1969, her company was receiving a good response to their ads in News of the World.

Joan advertised in The Sunday Express, Evening Standard, and The Observer—all major British newspapers at the time. At this time, Ball was running both Com-Pat and Eros. She decided to sell Eros and focus on Com-Pat, due to her belief in the future of computerized dating and the potential growth of a service like Com-Pat.

Com-Pat II 
In 1970, Com-Pat Two was launched. Joan and her company were using the most advanced matching system created at the time. The system used a questionnaire, and gave a list of four of the top matches at the end.

In 1971, there was a Post Office strike which halted all mail. It lasted almost eight weeks, and Ball's business couldn't operate during that time. The Daily Telegraph, the company's most successful advertising venue, refused to continue printing ads for Com-Pat after the paper changed their advertising policy. At the same time, the UK was wracked with major strikes and economic problems.

In 1973, when she was 39, Ball was finally diagnosed with dyslexia while struggling to come to terms with her own depression. By 1974, with the recession worsening, Ball, in debt, decided to sell her company. She called John Paterson of Dateline and offered Com-Pat to him, if he agreed to pay all of the company's debts as part of the purchase,  Patterson quickly agreed.

Personal life 
In 1961, she met a man she refers to in her memoir as Kenneth. Kenneth would later become her sexual partner and would help her in her business, though they were never married. After the launch of Com-Pat ll, she and her partner Ken began to run into economic and personal problems. Because Joan and Ken weren't married, Ball felt she had no sense of security with him. She eventually moved into her own flat after living with Ken for eight years. 

After a series of personal difficulties, Ball converted to Buddhism.

References 

Women Internet pioneers
Online dating services of the United Kingdom
1934 births
Living people
People with dyslexia
Matchmakers
Businesspeople from London
20th-century English businesswomen
20th-century English businesspeople